The Fair is a 1960 West German drama film directed by Wolfgang Staudte. It was entered into the 10th Berlin International Film Festival where Juliette Mayniel won the Silver Bear for Best Actress.

Cast
 Juliette Mayniel as Annette
 Götz George as Robert Mertens
 Hans Mahnke as Paul Mertens
 Wolfgang Reichmann as Georg Höchert
 Manja Behrens as Martha Mertens
 Fritz Schmiedel as Priest
 Erica Schramm as Eva Schumann
 Elisabeth Goebel as Wirtin Balthausen
 Benno Hoffmann as Wirt Balthausen
 Irmgard Kleber as Else Mertens
 Hansi Jochmann as Erika
 Solveig Loevel as Gertrud

References

External links

1960 films
1960 drama films
West German films
1960s German-language films
German drama films
German black-and-white films
Films directed by Wolfgang Staudte
Films about Nazi Germany
Films set in 1944
Films set in 1959
1960s German films